Belarus competed at the 2020 Summer Paralympics in Tokyo, Japan, from 24 August to 5 September 2021.

Medalists

Competitors
The following is the list of number of competitors participating in the Games:

Athletics 

Men's field

Women's field

Judo 

Women

Paracanoeing

Rowing

Belarus qualified one boats in the women's single sculls events for the games by winning the gold medal at the 2021 FISA European Qualification Regatta in Varese, Italy.

Qualification Legend: FA=Final A (medal); FB=Final B (non-medal); R=Repechage

Swimming 

Ten Belarusian swimmer has successfully entered the paralympic slot after breaking the MQS.

Men

Women

Wheelchair fencing 

Men

Women

See also 
Belarus at the Paralympics
Belarus at the 2020 Summer Olympics

References 

Nations at the 2020 Summer Paralympics
2020
2021 in Belarusian sport